Larry North is a man from Rusk County, Texas, United States, arrested on charges relating to planting a number of IEDs across Texas in April 2010.

References
 https://www.npr.org/blogs/thetwo-way/2010/04/texas_man_accused_of_domestic.html
 http://www.necn.com/04/08/10/Police-make-arrest-in-pipe-bomb-like-dev/landing_nation.html?blockID=212352&feedID=4207
 http://liveshots.blogs.foxnews.com/2010/04/08/tx-pipe-bomb-suspect-mad-at-government/?test=latestnews
 https://www.reuters.com/article/idUSTRE6374CY20100408
 http://www.google.com/hostednews/ap/article/ALeqM5gWR6MJRyzqOvEyvar0bjtY4C5SbAD9EUVMC80
 http://content.usatoday.com/communities/ondeadline/post/2010/04/mailbox-bomb-suspect-arrested-in-texas/1
 http://news.blogs.cnn.com/2010/04/07/arrest-made-after-devices-found-in-texas-mailboxes/
 http://www.cbs19.tv/Global/story.asp?S=12277353
 http://tpmmuckraker.talkingpointsmemo.com/2010/04/prosecutor_east_tx_man_distributed_pipe_bombs_beca.php

Notes

American male criminals
Bombers (people)
Living people
Year of birth missing (living people)